Ardani (Greek: Αρδάνι) is a village in the municipal unit of Paliokastro in the Trikala regional unit, Greece. Ardani had a population of 374 in 2011. Ardani is located 8 km north of Trikala, on the edge of the Thessalian Plain. The nearest village is Platanos.

Population

See also
List of settlements in the Trikala regional unit

External links
 Ardani on GTP Travel Pages

References

Populated places in Trikala (regional unit)